Diemen (abbreviation: Dmn) is the main railway station of the municipality of Diemen, Netherlands. The station was first opened in 1882 and then closed in 1929. It was reopened at the same location in 1974. The station building was completed in 1978. The train services are operated by Nederlandse Spoorwegen. There are connections to two bus services operated by GVB.

Location 
It is situated on the Amsterdam–Zutphen railway between the railway stations Amsterdam Science Park and Weesp.

Building 
The hexagonal station building was completed in 1978. It is of the type Sextant, which was designed by Cees Douma. Sixteen buildings of this type have been built in the years 1968–1979, seven of which remain today.

Train services 
The railway station was opened on 1 August 1882. The first train services were operated by the Hollandsche IJzeren Spoorweg-Maatschappij (HSM). The station was closed on 1 January 1929.

The station was reopened on 26 May 1974 at the same location. The HSM had merged into the Nederlandse Spoorwegen (NS) in 1938, which has operated the train services in Diemen since the reopening.

The following local Sprinter train services each call at Diemen twice per hour in both directions:
4600:  – Diemen –  –  – 
5800:  –  –  – Diemen –  –  –

Connections 
There are two bus connections at the station, which are both operated by Gemeentelijk Vervoerbedrijf (GVB):
44 (day service):  –  – Diemen – Diemen Noord
357 (night service):  – Diemen – Bijlmermeer

References

External links 

  Station Diemen, train schedules and station facilities

Buildings and structures completed in 1978
Diemen
Railway stations closed in 1929
Railway stations in North Holland
Railway stations opened in 1882
Railway stations opened in 1974